SOJ or variant, may refer to:

Places
 Jefferson (proposed Pacific state), the State of Jefferson (SOJ, SoJ), a movement in Northern California that is attempting to split the state of California, to make the 51st of the union.
 Sørkjosen Airport (IATA airport code SOJ), Nordreisa, Troms og Finnmark, Norway
 Sarojini Nagar station (Station code SOJ), South West Delhi, Delhi, India; see List of railway stations in India

Other uses
 Single Open Jaw, a kind of Open Jaw, used for calculating fares
 Small-outline J-lead Package (SOJ), a type of small-outline integrated circuit (SOIC)
 Soi language (ISO 639 language code soj), a Central Iranian language
 Phoenix Wright: Ace Attorney - Spirit of Justice (SoJ), a 2016 video game

See also

 S0J, the postal code for MacDowall, Saskatchewan, Canada
 
 
 
 
 State of Jefferson (disambiguation)
 Soia (disambiguation)
 Soja (disambiguation)
 Soya (disambiguation)
 Soy (disambiguation)
 Soi (disambiguation)